Lysosomal Pro-X carboxypeptidase is an enzyme that in humans is encoded by the PRCP gene.

The protein encoded by this gene is a lysosomal prolylcarboxypeptidase, which cleaves C-terminal amino acids linked to proline in peptides such as angiotensin II, III and des-Arg9-bradykinin. The cleavage occurs at acidic pH, but the enzyme activity is retained with some substrates at neutral pH. This enzyme has been shown to be an activator of the cell matrix-associated prekallikrein. The importance of angiotensin II, one of the substrates of this enzyme, in regulating blood pressure and electrolyte balance suggests that this gene may be related to essential hypertension. Alternatively spliced transcript variants encoding distinct isoforms have been observed.

References

Further reading